Palmer Taylor (born 13 September 1992 at Welland, Ontario) is a Canadian snowboarder.

Raised in Pelham, Ontario, she competed at the 2010 Winter Olympics in Vancouver in the women's halfpipe competition.

References

External links
 Palmer Taylor at the 2010 Winter Olympics

1992 births
Living people
Canadian female snowboarders
Olympic snowboarders of Canada
Snowboarders at the 2010 Winter Olympics
Sportspeople from Welland
Sportspeople from Ontario